Lucille "Lucie" Salhany (born May 25, 1946) is an American media executive of Jordanian and Lebanese Heritage. Salhany was the first woman to head a broadcast television network in 1993 in the position as Chairwoman of Fox Broadcasting Company. She later created the United Paramount Network. She has had over 30 years of experience in the entertainment business, and during the height of her career, was one of the most powerful women at the C-Suite level.

Early life 
Salhany was born in Cleveland, Ohio, to father Halim "Hal" Jacob Mady, who was Jordanian, and mother Matilda "Tillie" Mady (née Thomas), who was Lebanese. Her parents owned a grocery store in Cleveland.

Salhany graduated from Brush High School in Lyndhurst, Ohio, in 1964. Salhany attended Kent State University but after dropping out at age 19, she did not continue her education after more than a year.

Career

TV Broadcasting 
In 1967, Salhany got a job as a secretary to the Program Manager at an independent TV station in Cleveland called WKBF-TV. She was continuously promoted, and after training by her boss, when she was 24, she took over his position as Program Manager of the station. In 1975, Salhany became program manager of the Boston TV station, WLVI-TV.

In 1979, Salhany become Vice President for Programming for Taft Broadcasting Company in Philadelphia, Pennsylvania. Salhany was responsible for bringing then local Chicago talk-show host, Oprah Winfrey to Taft in a syndication deal. Salhany also championed "The Arsenio Hall Show," "Hard Copy" and "Entertainment Tonight.”

In 1985, Salhany moved to Paramount Domestic Television in Los Angeles as president and supervised the production of shows like Entertainment Tonight, The Arsenio Hall Show, Hard Copy, and Star Trek: The Next Generation.

FOX 
In 1991, former Paramount colleague and newly hired FOX Broadcasting CEO Barry Diller asked Salhany to become Chairman of Twentieth Television. When Diller was fired four months later, Rupert Murdoch gave her Diller's job. The position was Chairman of FOX News Network.

In 1993, Salhany was responsible for the development the late night show, The Chevy Chase Show, but it was canceled after 6 weeks on air, and was not well received by critics or affiliates alike. The canceled show cost the network tens of millions of dollars. Although Salhany took the network from four nights of programming to seven nights of programming, and was responsible for creating the TV show, The X-Files, which was very successful, and brought the NFL to the network, she left after three and a half years on her five-year contract, saying that Murdoch breached terms of her contract by not maintaining reporting structure. Salhany claimed Murdoch, in meetings in front of others, asked if she was a "fem-Nazi" and what her husband would think of things.

UPN 
She moved back to Paramount as they were about to launch the United Paramount Network, also known as the UPN—which later merged with The WB. Salhany was Chief Executive Officer of UPN from 1995 to 1997.

In 1997, after leaving UPN, Salhany moved to Boston, where her husband is based, and started a media consultancy business called JH Media.

From 1999 to 2002: Salhany was President/Chief Executive Officer of LifeFX Networks, Inc., a company that animated faces.

In 2003, Salhany co-founded Echo Bridge Entertainment, LLC.

Hewlett-Packard 
Salhany joined the Hewlett-Packard (HP) Board of Directors in January 2002, in connection with the acquisition of Compaq Computer Corporation. In 2002, she also became a member of the HR and Compensation Committee.

Salhany was appointed to the Audit Committee in September 2006. In the same month, she became the Chair of the Nominating and Governance Committee.

As a result of new leadership and heavy criticism of HP’s board, Salhany left HP’s board in 2011. Leo Apotheker, took over as chief of HP in November 2010 and brought in five new directors to diversify leadership.

Leading up to Salhany’s departure, the HP board faced shareholder lawsuits and received criticism from analysts and shareholders, over the hiring of Apotheker. Of the 12-member board who voted to hire Apotheker, the majority of board members had never met Apotheker.

Leadership 
 ALSAC/St. Jude Children's Research Hospital, Professional Advisory Board Member
 American Media, Inc., Director
 1997-2002: Compaq Computer Corporation, Board Member until its merger with Hewlett-Packard Company in 2002
 2002-2011: Hewlett-Packard Company, Board Member 
 Emerson College, Trustee
 ION Media Networks, Board Member
 Lasell College, Advisory Council
 Screens Entertainment Association, Board Member

Awards 
 1992: ALSAC/St. Jude Children's Research Hospital, Honorary Doctor of Humane Letters
 1993: Broadcasting & Cable Hall of Fame
 1995: American Jewish Committee, Sherrill C. Corwin Human Relations Award (first female recipient)
 1995: American Women in Radio and Television, Silver Satellite Award
 1996: Caucus for Producers, Writers & Directors, Executive of the Year
 1997: HELP Humanitarian Award
 1997: Cable Financial Management Organization, Avatar Award
 National Academy of Television Arts and Sciences, Silver Circle Award
 2013: Lasell College, Honorary Doctor of Humane Letters

Personal life 
Salhany is married to Boston restaurateur John Polcari, Jr. of Regina Pizzeria and Polcari's. They have two sons, Hal and Jake, whom they adopted from Beirut, Lebanon. She was previously married in the late 1960s.

References

Further reading 
 King, Larry, and Pat Piper. "Lucie Salhany, former president and CEO, UPN Television." Future Talk: Conversations About Tomorrow with Today's Most Provocative Personalities. New York: HarperPerennial, 1999.  
 Kimmel, Daniel M. The Fourth Network: How Fox Broke the Rules and Reinvented Television. Chicago: I.R. Dee, 2004.  

1946 births
Living people
UPN television network executives
Middle Eastern Christians
Fox Broadcasting Company executives
Women television executives
Businesspeople from Cleveland
American people of Jordanian descent
American people of Lebanese descent
Compaq
American women in television
Hewlett-Packard people